Alexander William Boyle (14 December 1929 – 29 July 2018) was an Australian rules footballer who played for the Carlton Football Club in the Victorian Football League (VFL).

Notes

External links 

Alex Boyle's profile at Blueseum

1929 births
2018 deaths
Carlton Football Club players
Australian rules footballers from Victoria (Australia)
Oakleigh Football Club players